Argiope blanda is a species of orb weaver in the spider family Araneidae. It is found in a range from the United States to Costa Rica.

References

blanda
Articles created by Qbugbot
Spiders described in 1898